Barun Das (born 15 November 1969) is an Indian Entrepreneur,  Business Leader, Media Person and Motivational Speaker, currently the MD & CEO of TV9 Network (largest news network in India in terms of viewership numbers).
He is an alumnus of IIT Madras, IIM Calcutta and London School of Economics. He has over 25 years of experience in the Media sector, both in India and abroad – in top managerial positions.
Barun was a member of the International Academy of Television Arts and Sciences and was a juror for the finals of the International Emmys.  A strategist from an early age, Barun was selected for Junior National Bridge team.

Career 
His last corporate assignment, before TV9, was with Zee News Ltd. (currently Zee Media Corporation Ltd), being the youngest CEO of any news network in India. Prior to this, he held top management posts at MCCS (owner of the erstwhile Star group's news operations in India), India Today Group, ABP Group, and  Head of International Business at Astro All Asia, Networks Plc. Kuala Lumpur.

After his stint in Zee, Barun dipped his toe in entrepreneurship and started Mydia100 Communications Pvt. Ltd., focusing on convergence of technology, content and healthcare, which was later acquired by TV9 Network.

In the short stint with TV9 Network, he has led TV9 Bharatvarsh to No.1 position in the BARC ratings as in March 2022. He was named the managing director of TV9 Network in June 2022.

Barun is known for his out of the box thinking. Under his leadership, TV9 Network, has experimented with various disruptive ideas. Money9, which is India's first multilingual personal finance platform and News9 Plus, which is India's first video magazine OTT service was launched under his leadership.

TV9 Network conducted their inaugural Global summit - What India Thinks Today in June 2022, which was a huge success. 75 speakers across domains discussed India's position in the new international order. Former UK Prime Minister David Cameron was interviewed by Barun Das in this edition.

Duologue 
In 2022, News9 Plus launched a new format of discussions called Duologue with Barun Das. The idea is to get up close and personal with celebrated people from different domain. Styled similar to The David Letterman Show, this is a conversation between Das and a legend. It unfolds the life and theories of both the host and the guest.

Recognition 

 CEO Insights - Top 10 Group CEOs 2022

References

Living people
Indian chief executives
1969 births